The Constitution Alteration (Industry and Commerce) Bill 1926, was an unsuccessful proposal to alter the Australian Constitution to extend the Commonwealth legislative power in respect to corporations, and to give it the power to make laws with respect to trusts and combinations in restraint of trade, trade unions and employer associations. It was put to voters for approval in a referendum held on 4 September 1926.

Question
Do you approve of the proposed law for the alteration of the Constitution entitled 'Constitution Alteration (Industry and Commerce) 1926'?

The proposal was to alter section 51 of the Constitution as follows:

Section fifty-one of the Constitution is altered— industry and Commerce. 
{a) by omitting from paragraph (xx.) the words “Foreign corporations, and trading or financial corporations formed within the limits of the Commonwealth ”, and inserting in their stead the words ‘‘Corporations, including— 
(a) the creation, regulation, control and dissolution of corporations; 
(b) the regulation, control and dissolution of corporations formed under the law of a State; and 
(c) the regulation and control of foreign corporations ; but not including municipal or governmental corporations, or any corporation formed solely for religious, charitable, scientific or artistic purposes, or any corporation not formed for the acquisition of gain by the corporation or its members ” ; 
(b) by omitting from paragraph (xxxv.) the words “ extending beyond the limits of any one State ”; and 
(c) by inserting after paragraph (xxxix.) the following paragraphs:— 
(xl.) Establishing authorities with such powers as the Parliament confers on them with respect to the regulation and determination of terms and conditions of industrial employment and of rights and duties of employers and employees with respect to industrial matters and things: 
(xli.) Investing State authorities with any powers which the Parliament, by virtue of paragraph (Xxxv.) or paragraph (xl.) of this section, has vested or has power to vest in any authority established by the Commonwealth: 
(xlii.) Trusts and combinations (whether composed of individuals or corporations or both) in restraint of trade, trade unions, and associations of employers or of employees for industrial purposes, including the formation, regulation control and dissolution thereof.

Results
The referendum was not approved by a majority of voters, and a majority of the voters was achieved in only two states, New South Wales and Queensland.Question: Do you approve of the proposed law for the alteration of the Constitution entitled 'Constitution Alteration (Industry and Commerce) 1926'?

References

Referendum (Industry and Commerce)
1926 referendums
1926 (Industry and Commerce)